Agnes Eustacia Kenig (born 1995/1996), known professionally as Agnes O'Casey, is an English actor. She is known for her onscreen debut as Vivien Epstein in the 2021 BBC One drama Ridley Road.

Early life
O'Casey is from Finsbury Park, the eldest of three daughters of hospitality and retail workers. She is of Irish and a quarter Jewish descent; the playwright Seán O'Casey was her great-grandfather. O'Casey has dyslexia and attended a Steiner School. Her family
moved to Newton Abbot, Devon, when she was 11. She studied art history and English literature at Edinburgh University for a year before being accepted to The Lir Academy in Dublin, graduating with a Bachelor of Arts in acting in 2020.

Filmography

Film

Television

Music videos

Stage

References

External links
 

1996 births
Living people
21st-century English actresses
Actresses from Devon
Actresses from London
English people of Irish descent
English people of Jewish descent
People from Finsbury Park
People from Newton Abbot
Actors with dyslexia